Tripper is the debut album by the Danish group Efterklang. The name of the album according to member Thomas Humser refers to two things. One meaning is that "tripper" is the slang term for a traveler. It is also a Danish meaning for shuffling one's feet in anticipation of something good to happen. The album cover was done by Marie Hill and is literally a mashing of doodle she drew. The logo of the child dancing next to the band's name apparently is supposed to represent the childlike approach to this music. The self-released limited edition version of the album had a hand stitched card sleeve.

Track listing
 "Foetus" – 3:10
 "Swarming" – 6:32
 "Step Aside" – 4:38
 "Prey and Predator" – 6:26
 "Collecting Shields" – 5:57
 "Doppelgänger" – 6:40
 "Tortuous Tracks" – 3:39
 "Monopolist" – 6:57
 "Chapter 6" – 6:37

Personnel and credits 

 Artwork By [Cover Concept] - Efterklang
 Artwork By [Front And Label Drawings] - Marie Hill
 Cello - Ida Kühn Riegels (tracks: 1, 2, 5, 8), Marianne Larsen (tracks: 2, 4, 8, 9)
 Choir - Ditte Marie Legard Ipsen, Katrine & Anne Fokdal Choir (tracks: 1 to 3, 5, 8, 9), # Dubbelgänger Men's Choir (tracks: 3 to 6, 8, 9), Grøndlændertruppen MIK (tracks: 1, 4, 5, 9)
 Double Bass - Eva Skipper (tracks: 4, 6, 9)
 Flugelhorn, French Horn - Bo Holm-Nielsen (tracks: 5, 8, 9)
 Flute - Lise Bertelsen (tracks: 3, 4, 9)
 Mastered By - Michael Schwabe
 Performer - Casper Clausen, Mads Brauer*, Rasmus Stolberg, Rune Mølgaard, Thomas Husmer
 Performer [Visuals] - Karim Ghahwagi
 Producer - Casper
 Recorded By, Mixed By, Producer - Mads
 Trombone - Jesper Bergmann (tracks: 5, 8, 9), Nils Carlsson (tracks: 6 to 9), Rasmus Skovgaard (tracks: 5, 8, 9)
 Trumpet - Henrik Lützen (tracks: 5, 8, 9), Kristina Schjelde (tracks: 1, 3 to 5, 8)
 Violin - Edda Rún Ólafsdóttir (tracks: 1, 3, 5, 6), Hildur Àrsælsdóttir* (tracks: 1, 3, 5, 6), # Nils Grøndal (tracks: 2, 4, 8, 9)
 Vocals - Linda Drejer Bonde (tracks: 2 to 6, 8, 9), Thomas Sjöberg (tracks: 2, 4 to 6)
 All songs written by - Efterklang

References

2004 albums
Efterklang albums
The Leaf Label albums